Craig Schurig (born March 2, 1965) is an American football coach and former player.  He is the current head football coach for Washburn University in Topeka, Kansas and he held that position since the 2002 season. He is the 40th person to hold the post. He is known for turning around a once losing program to a winning program. As of the 2013 Washburn University budget, Schurig's salary is listed as $101,303.

Schurig led the Washburn football program to a win in the 2004 Mineral Water Bowl. The Ichabods posted their first NCAA Division II playoff appearance and their first Mid-America Intercollegiate Athletics Association (MIAA) championship in 2005. The conference championship was the first for the Ichabods since the 1983 season. Schurig earned the MIAA Coach of the Year honors for his efforts leading the Ichabods that season. He was also named the AFCA's Region 3 Coach of the Year.

Prior to becoming the Washburn head coach, Schurig spent nine years as an assistant coach under Chuck Broyles at Pittsburg State University.

Personal life
Schurig grew up in Willingboro Township, New Jersey. He graduated in 1987 with a bachelor’s degree in petroleum engineering from Colorado School of Mines and went on to earn a master's degree in physical education at Pittsburg State University in 1996.  He lives in Topeka, Kansas with his wife, a daughter, and two sons.

Head coaching record

References

External links
 Washburn profile

1965 births
Living people
American football defensive backs
Colorado Mines Orediggers football coaches
Colorado Mines Orediggers football players
Pittsburg State Gorillas football coaches
Washburn Ichabods football coaches
Pittsburg State University alumni
People from Willingboro Township, New Jersey
Players of American football from New Jersey
Sportspeople from Burlington County, New Jersey